Melangyna labiatarum is a European species of hoverfly.

References

Diptera of Europe
Syrphinae
Syrphini
Taxa named by George Henry Verrall
Insects described in 1901